Omega Octantis, (latinized from ω Octantis), is a solitary, bluish-white hued star located in the southern circumpolar constellation Octans. It has an apparent magnitude of 5.87, allowing it to be faintly seen with the naked eye. Based on the object's parallax measurements, it is estimated to be 328 light years distant. However, it is drifting closer with a heliocentric radial velocity .
 
Omega Octantis has a stellar classification of B9.5 V, indicating that it is a main-sequence star between the B9 and A0 classes. Helmut A. Abt & Nidia I. Morrell gave a slightly updated class of B9.5 Vs, which includes sharp (narrow) absorption lines in Omega Octantis' spectrum due to slow rotation. It has a mass 2.54 times that of the Sun and is calculated to be 197 million years old, having completed 40% of its main sequence lifetime. The slow rotation is consistent with the spectral classification from Abt & Morell (1995).

References

B-type main-sequence stars
Octans
Octantis, Omega
Octantis, 23
PD-84 00490
131596
074296
5557